Saga Prefectural Saga Technical High School (佐賀県立佐賀工業高等学校), also known as Saga Kogyo, is a technical high school in Saga City, Saga Prefecture, Japan.

History

Curriculum 
Saga Kogyo offers its students technical courses. These include:
Mechanics (Kikai)
Electricity (Denki)
Electronics and Information Technology (Denshi Johou)
Architecture (Kenchiku)

Clubs 
Mechanical Science Club
Electronic Science Club
Robotics Club
Architectural Design Club
Newspaper Club
Book Club
AudioVisual Club
Art Club
Brassband Club
Interact Club
JRC Volunteer Club (Japanese Red Cross)

Alumni 
Shigeo Shingo, a Japanese industrial engineer who distinguished himself as one of the world's leading experts on manufacturing practices
Tachikawa Goshi, professional rugby player for the Toshiba Brave Lupus. He was in the 2007 Japan National Rugby Team squad

See also
 Sanix World Rugby Youth Tournament
 National High School Rugby Tournament
 List of high schools in Japan

External links
Saga Kogyo website (in Japanese)
Sanix World Youth Tournament website (in Japanese)
Sanix World Youth Tournament - Map To The Global Arena (in Japanese)

High schools in Saga Prefecture
Rugby in Kyushu
Schools in Saga Prefecture
Educational institutions established in 1898
1898 establishments in Japan